Ilyino is a rural locality (a village) in Malyginskoye Rural Settlement, Kovrovsky District, Vladimir Oblast, Russia. The population was 252 as of 2010. There are 2 streets.

Geography 
Ilyino is located 26 km northeast of Kovrov (the district's administrative centre) by road. Artemovo is the nearest rural locality.

References 

Rural localities in Kovrovsky District